Minuartia californica, commonly known as California sandwort, is a species of flowering plant in the family Caryophyllaceae.

It is native to valleys, foothills, and mountains in California and Oregon. It grows in many types of habitat, including chaparral, vernal pools, and roadsides.

Description
Minuartia californica  is a small annual herb producing a hair-thin stem no more than 12 centimeters tall, in erect or spreading, branching form. The narrow leaves are just a few millimeters long and under 2 millimeters wide.

The tiny flower has five white petals and five veined, pointed sepals.

External links
Jepson Manual Treatment: Minuartia californica
USDA Plants Profile: Minuartia californica (California sandwort)
Flora of North America
Minuartia californica — U.C. Photo gallery

californica
Flora of California
Flora of Oregon
Flora of the Cascade Range
Flora of the Klamath Mountains
Flora of the Sierra Nevada (United States)
Natural history of the California chaparral and woodlands
Natural history of the California Coast Ranges
Natural history of the Central Valley (California)
Flora without expected TNC conservation status